Enric Pi Solà (born 20 May 1983) is a Spanish professional footballer who plays for FC Santa Coloma as a left winger.

Club career
Born in Granollers, Barcelona, Catalonia, Pi made his senior debut with lowly EC Granollers on 11 March 2001, in the regional leagues. In the 2002 summer he moved to RCD Mallorca's reserves in Segunda División B. He appeared regularly for the Balearics, being also called up with the main squad in a 1–2 La Liga away loss against Racing de Santander, but remaining unused.

Pi continued to appear in the third level but also in Tercera División in the following years, representing FC Cartagena, UE Sant Andreu, UD Lanzarote, CE Premià, CE Europa, CF Reus Deportiu, CD Teruel and UE Llagostera. With the latter he achieved a promotion to Segunda División in the end of the 2013–14 campaign, appearing in 35 matches and scoring a career-best 12 goals.

On 10 September 2014, aged 31, Pi played his first match as a professional, starting in a 0–2 away loss against Real Betis for the season's Copa del Rey.

References

External links
 
 
 

1983 births
Living people
Footballers from Granollers
Spanish footballers
Spanish expatriate footballers
Association football wingers
Segunda División players
Segunda División B players
Tercera División players
Primera Divisió players
RCD Mallorca B players
FC Cartagena footballers
UE Sant Andreu footballers
CE Europa footballers
CF Reus Deportiu players
CD Teruel footballers
UE Costa Brava players
CF Badalona players
EC Granollers players
UE Sant Julià players
FC Santa Coloma players
Expatriate footballers in Andorra
Spanish expatriate sportspeople in Andorra